Paežeriai Manor is a former residential manor in Paežeriai village, Šiauliai District Municipality, near Nelinda lake.

References

Manor houses in Lithuania
Šiauliai County